Araschnia doris is a butterfly found in the Palearctic that belongs to the browns 
family. It is endemic to West and Central China.

Description from Seitz

A. doris Leech (male 64e, female 64f) again closely resembles burejana, but also recalls strigosa. It differs from
both in the more rounded wings and in the markings of the distal marginal area of the hindwing. On the
latter the blue-spotted submarginal band is absent, being replaced by a row of rounded or partly quadrangular
black spots, also the underside of the hindwing exhibiting some essential differences, so that the specific distinctness
appears to be established. — Central and West China (June, July).

References

Araschnia
Butterflies described in 1892